Nantahala may refer to:

Nantahala Lake, a lake  in Macon County, North Carolina, in the United States
The Nantahala National Forest, a national forest in North Carolina in the United States
The Nantahala Outdoor Center,  a commercial outdoor guide service and retail store near Bryson City, North Carolina, in the United States
The Nantahala River, a river in western North Carolina in the United States
The Southern Nantahala Wilderness, a federally preserved wilderness area in Georgia and North Carolina in the United States
, the name of more than one United States Navy ship